Grange School may refer to:

 The Grange School, Aylesbury, Buckinghamshire, England
 The Grange School, Northwich, Cheshire, England
 The Grange School, Santiago, Chile
 The Grange School, Christchurch, Dorset, England
 Grange School, Ikeja, Lagos, Nigeria

See also
 Grange Academy (disambiguation)